Tsutsukowake Shrine (都々古別神社, Tsutsukowake jinja) is a Shinto shrine located in Tanagura, Fukushima Prefecture, Japan. It was the ichinomiya of Mutsu Province. According to legend, it was founded in 807.

See also
List of Shinto shrines in Japan

Shinto shrines in Fukushima Prefecture

Beppyo shrines